Qayyum may refer to:

 Al-Qayyūm, one of the names of God in Islam
 Qayyum (Sufism), a special spiritual position of a saint
 Qayyūm al-asmā, text by the Báb

People
Given name
 Qayyum Chowdhury (1932–2014), Bangladeshi painter
 Qayyum Marjoni (born 1994), Malaysian footballer
 Qayyum Nazar (1914-1989), Pakistani Urdu language poet
 Qayyum Raishyan (born 2000), Singaporean footballer 

Middle name
 Wasiq Qayyum Abbasi, Pakistani politician, member of the Provincial Assembly of the Punjab 

Surname
 Azhar Qayyum (born 1977), Pakistani politician, member of the National Assembly of Pakistan
 Bushra Qayyum (born 1995), Pakistani badminton player
 Hasnain Qayyum (born 1975), Pakistani cricketer
 Imran Qayyum (born 1993), English cricketer 
 Kazi Zahirul Qayyum, Bangladesh politician and Member of Parliament
 Khlid Qayyum (born 1958), Indian cricketer
 Malik Mohammad Qayyum (born 1944), former Attorney General of Pakistan
 Sahibzada Abdul Qayyum (1863–1937), Indian (British India) educationist and politician 
 Tazeen Qayyum, Pakistani-Canadian artist
 Tengku Qayyum (born 1986), Malaysian footballer
 Zainab Qayyum (born 1975), Pakistani model

See also
Abdul Qayyum, a masculine given name
 Qayyum Stadium also known as Peshawar Sport Complex, multi-sports stadium in Peshawar, Pakistan

Arabic-language surnames